Sir James Bell Donald  (13 October 1879 – 4 December 1971) was a United Party Member of Parliament and Cabinet Minister in Auckland, New Zealand.

Biography

Early life
Donald was born in Auckland on 13 October 1879. He was the second son of Mr. Alexander Bell Donald, a local merchant and trader, who owned the firm of Donald and Edeuborough. Donald studied at Queen's College and then entered his father's profession and would later become the firm's managing director. By the age of 48 he became a justice of the peace.

Member of Parliament

According to Olsen, Lee's opponent was "a staunch anti-militarist who had been gaoled during the [Great] war". He was a cabinet minister from 1928 to 1931 in the United Government (Minister of Marine, Minister of Industries and Commerce, Minister of Customs, Postmaster-General and Minister of Telegraphs, and Minister in charge of Public Service Superannuation, Friendly Societies, and National Provident Fund Departments). Donald was one of several ministers who had not only no prior ministerial experience but no previous parliamentary experience either due to the unexpected success of United. Nevertheless he proved himself to be an able minister.

When a coalition government was formed between the United and Reform parties Donald was one of the ministers that were removed from the cabinet in order to accommodate the new Reform members. When he retired (to general surprise) in 1931, the electorate went back to Labour due to vote-splitting as there were four anti-Labour candidates: William Henry Horton from United, Harold Percy Burton (who came second) and Ellen Melville from Reform and an Independent John Alexander Arthur. This handed the seat back to Labour "on a plate".

In 1935, he was awarded the King George V Silver Jubilee Medal. In 1935 he stood again for the Auckland East seat as the newly formed Democrat Party's candidate. He placed third out of four candidates.

He was also a long serving member of the Auckland City Council serving 18 years between 1923 and 1941. Additionally, from 1935 was the council's representative on the Auckland Harbour Board where he became deputy chairman. In 1946 he was chairman of the Harbour Board until 1947 when he declined to seek re-election. He was a leading member of the Citizens & Ratepayers Association and was its chairman for 16 years between 1935 and 1951.

Later life and death
After exiting Parliament he resumed his business activities in Auckland. In 1936 he became a director of the Northern Roller Milling Company and was chairman of the board of directors from 1954 to 1959 before retiring from the board in 1960.

He was later appointed a Knight Bachelor, for services to the community, in the 1969 New Year Honours.

Donald died in 1971 aged 92.

In 2016 Donald's granddaughter Desley Simpson was elected a member of the Auckland Council and Simpson paid tribute to him in her maiden speech and wore the fob chain presented to him when he became deputy chairman of the Auckland Harbour Board in 1935.

Notes

References

|-

1889 births
1971 deaths
United Party (New Zealand) MPs
Members of the Cabinet of New Zealand
Members of the New Zealand House of Representatives
New Zealand MPs for Auckland electorates
New Zealand Knights Bachelor
New Zealand politicians convicted of crimes
New Zealand conscientious objectors
Unsuccessful candidates in the 1935 New Zealand general election
New Zealand Democrat Party (1934) politicians
New Zealand justices of the peace
Auckland City Councillors
Auckland Harbour Board members